Dzvinia Orlowsky (born in Cambridge, Ohio) is a Ukrainian American poet, translator, editor, and teacher. She received her BA from Oberlin College and her MFA from the Warren Wilson College MFA Program for Writers. She is author of six poetry collections including Convertible Night, Flurry of Stones (Carnegie Mellon University Press, 2009) for which she received a Sheila Motton Book Award, and Silvertone (Carnegie Mellon University Press, 2013) for which she was named Ohio Poetry Day Association's 2014 Co-Poet of the Year. Her first collection, A Handful of Bees, was reprinted in 2009 as a Carnegie Mellon University Classic Contemporary. Her sixth, Bad Harvest, was published in fall of 2018 and was named a 2019 Massachusetts Book Awards “Must Read” in Poetry. Her co-translations with Ali Kinsella from the Ukrainian of selected poems by Natalka Bilotserkivets, "Eccentric Days of Hope and Sorrow" was published by Lost Horse Press in fall, 2021 and short-listed for the 2022 Griffin International Poetry Prize, the Derek Walcott Poetry Prize the ALTA National Translation Award, and awarded the 2022 AAUS Translation Prize.     

Jeff Friedman's and her co-translation of Memorials by Polish poet Mieczyslaw Jastrun was published by Dialogos in 2014, and she and Friedman were awarded a 2016 National Endowment for the Arts Literature Translation Fellowship in support of continuing their translation work of Jastrun's poems.

In addition to the above, other honors include a Pushcart Prize (2007); A Massachusetts Cultural Council Professional Development Grant (1999); a Massachusetts Cultural Council Poetry Grant (1998); She has also been a finalist in the Grolier Prize, The Academy of American Poets Prize at Ohio State University, and the New Literary Awards Prize.  Her poem sequence “The (Dis)enchanted Desna” was a winner of the 2019 New England Poetry Club Samuel Washington Allen Prize, selected by Robert Pinsky, and her and Kinsella's co-translation from the Ukrainian of Natalka Bilotserkivets's poem sequence "Allergy" was winner of the New England Poetry Club's Diana Der Hovanessian Prize in Translation.  More recently, Dzvinia Orlowsky's poem "Our Wagons Were Made Entirely Out of Wood" was selected by Bruce Weigl for the 2022 1st Annual Ampersand Award for Poetry and Prose, sponsored by Pulse & Echo magazine.

Dzvinia Orlowsky's poems, short fiction pieces, and translations have appeared in a number of magazines, including Agni, Columbia, Field, New Flash Fiction, 100 Word Story,  Los Angeles Review, Plume, Poetry International, The Baffler, The Massachusetts Review, Ploughshares, The Spoon River Review, and The American Poetry Review.

Her work has also appeared in numerous anthologies including Nasty Women Poets:  An Unapologetic Anthology of Subversive Verse (edited by Grace Bauer and Julie Kane, Lost Horse Press, 2017); Nothing Short of 100:  Selected tales from 100 Word Story  (Outpost19, 2018); Plume Anthologies 2-6; The Working Poet: 75 Writing Exercises and a Poetry Anthology (Autumn House Press, 2009); Never Before, Poems about First Experiences (Four Way Books, 2005); Poetry from Sojourner, A Feminist Anthology (University of Illinois Press, 2004); Dorothy Parker’s Elbow (Warner Books, 2002); A Hundred Years of Youth:  A Bilingual Anthology of 20th Century Ukrainian Poetry (Lviv, 2000).  A Map of Hope: An International Literary Anthology (Rutgers University Press, 1999); and From Three Worlds: New Writing from the Ukraine (Zephyr Press, 1996).

A founding editor (1993-2001) of New York-based Four Way Books, she is also contributing editor to Agni and served as Editor for Poetry in Translation for Solstice: A Magazine of Diverse Voices (2014-2017). She has taught poetry at the Mt. Holyoke Writers' Conference; The Boston Center for Adult Education; Emerson College; Gemini Ink; Keene State College Summer Writers Conference; Stonecoast Summer Writers’ Conference; Stonecoast MFA Program in Creative Writing; Writers in Paradise; the 2005 Solstice Summer Writers’ Conference at Pine Manor College; and as 2012-2013 Visiting Guest Poet and Adjunct Assistant Professor at Providence College. She is also founder and director of NIGHT RIFFS: A Solstice Literary Magazine Reading and Music Series. Dzvinia Orlowsky currently teaches creative writing at Providence College and serves as Writer-in-Residence of poetry at The Solstice Low-Residency MFA in Creative Writing Program of Pine Manor College.  She lives with her husband, Jay Hoffman, in Marshfield, Massachusetts.

Published works
 "Eccentric Days of Hope and Sorrow: Selected Poems by Natalka Bilotserkivets" co-translated by Orlowsky and Kinsella (Lost Horse Press, 2021)
Bad Harvest  (Carnegie Mellon University Press, 2018)
Memorials:  A Selection, by Mieczyslaw Jastrun translated by Orlowsky and Friedman (Dialogos, 2014)
Silvertone (Carnegie Mellon University Press, 2013)
 A Handful of Bees (Carnegie Mellon University Press Classic Contemporary, 2009)
Convertible Night, Flurry of Stones (Carnegie Mellon University Press, 2009)
The Enchanted Desna by Alexander Dovzhenko translated from Ukrainian (House Between Water, 2006)
Except for One Obscene Brushstroke (Carnegie Mellon University Press, 2004)
Edge of House (Carnegie Mellon University Press, 1999)
A Handful of Bees (Carnegie Mellon University Press, 1994)
The Four Way Reader 2 edited by Carlen Arnett, Jane Brox, Dzvinia Orlowsky, Martha Rhodes (Four Way Books 2001)
The Four Way Reader 1 edited by Jane Brox, Dzvinia Orlowsky, Martha Rhodes (Four Way Books 1996)

References

External links
 
 American Poetry Review: Articles on Dzvinia Orlowsky
 ForeWord Magazine: Review of Convertible Night, Flurry of Stones
 Solstice: Silvertone
 Ploughshares: Site Zero}
 The Drunken Boat: Dzvinia Orlowsky 1
 The Drunken Boat: Dzvinia Orlowsky 2
 The Enchanted Desna on The Drunken Boat: Translation Excerpt 1
 The Enchanted Desna on Agni Online: Translation Excerpt 2
 Červená Barva Press: Dzvinia Orlowsky interviews Alex Motyl
 Green Mountains Literary Review: Silvertone
 Providence College Faculty Author: Dzvinia Orlowsky
 Providence College Publication Highlights: Dzvinia Orlowsky

Ukrainian–English translators
Living people
People from Cambridge, Ohio
Oberlin College alumni
Warren Wilson College alumni
Emerson College faculty
American people of Ukrainian descent
Year of birth missing (living people)
University of Southern Maine faculty
American women poets
20th-century American poets
20th-century American women writers
20th-century American translators
21st-century American poets
21st-century American women writers
21st-century American translators
Poets from Ohio
American women academics